Nadab may refer to:

 Nadab (son of Aaron), Biblical figure, eldest son of Aaron the High Priest of Israel
 Nadab of Israel (Hebrew: נדב NaDaḄ meaning "nobel"), king of the northern Kingdom of Israel, reigned c. 901-900 BCE
 Nădab, a village administered by Chişineu-Criş town, Arad County, Romania